Anthony Thornton (November 9, 1814 – September 10, 1904) was an American attorney who served as a U.S. Representative from Illinois and a justice of the Illinois Supreme Court.

Bio 

Born near Paris, Kentucky, Thornton attended the common schools and Centre College, Danville, Kentucky. He graduated from Miami University, Ohio, in 1834. He studied law under his uncle, John R. Thornton. He was admitted to the bar and commenced practice in Shelbyville, Illinois, in 1836. He served as major of militia during the war with Mexico. He served as delegate to the State constitutional conventions in 1847 and 1862, and was a member of the Illinois House of Representatives in 1851–52. In 1856, he held a joint debate with Abraham Lincoln in Shelbyville, Illinois.

Thornton was elected as a Democrat to the Thirty-ninth Congress (March 4, 1865 – March 3, 1867). He was not a candidate for renomination in 1866. He resumed the practice of law. He served as justice of the Supreme Court of Illinois from 1870 to 1873, when he resigned. He served as president of the Illinois State Bar Association for four terms. He served as chairman of the State board of arbitration 1895–1897. He died in Shelbyville, Illinois, on September 10, 1904.  He was interred in Glenwood Cemetery.

References

External links

 

1814 births
1904 deaths
Democratic Party members of the Illinois House of Representatives
Centre College alumni
Miami University alumni
Illinois lawyers
Justices of the Illinois Supreme Court
American military personnel of the Mexican–American War
People from Paris, Kentucky
American militia officers
Democratic Party members of the United States House of Representatives from Illinois
19th-century American politicians
19th-century American judges